{{DISPLAYTITLE:3alpha(17beta)-hydroxysteroid dehydrogenase (NAD+)}}

In enzymology, a 3alpha(17beta)-hydroxysteroid dehydrogenase (NAD+) is an enzyme that catalyzes the chemical reaction:

testosterone + NAD+  androst-4-ene-3,17-dione + NADH + H+

Thus, the two substrates of this enzyme are testosterone and NAD+, whereas its 3 products are androst-4-ene-3,17-dione, NADH, and H+.

This enzyme belongs to the family of oxidoreductases, specifically those acting on the CH-OH group of donor with NAD+ or NADP+ as acceptor. The systematic name of this enzyme class is 3alpha(or 17beta)-hydroxysteroid:NAD+ oxidoreductase. Other names in common use include 3alpha,17beta-hydroxy steroid dehydrogenase, 3alpha(17beta)-HSD, and 3alpha(17beta)-hydroxysteroid dehydrogenase (NAD+). This enzyme participates in androgen and estrogen metabolism.

References

 

EC 1.1.1
NADH-dependent enzymes
Enzymes of unknown structure